As Good As New is 1933 British drama film directed by Graham Cutts and starring Winna Winifried, John Batten and Sunday Wilshin. It was based on a play by Thompson Buchanan. It was made at Teddington Studios. It was a quota quickie made by the British branch of Warner Brothers.

Premise
A woman, disappointed in love, becomes increasingly cynical and attempts to marry a wealthy man.

Partial cast
 Winna Winifried as Elsa
 John Batten as Tom
 Sunday Wilshin as Rosa
 Toni Edgar-Bruce as Nurse Adams

References

Bibliography
 Low, Rachel. The History of British Film: Volume VII. Routledge, 1997.

External links
 

1933 films
1933 drama films
Films directed by Graham Cutts
British drama films
Films shot at Teddington Studios
Warner Bros. films
Quota quickies
British black-and-white films
1930s English-language films
1930s British films